Kevin Patrick Cronin Jr. (born October 6, 1951) is an American singer and songwriter, who is the lead vocalist, rhythm guitarist, and pianist for the rock band REO Speedwagon. The band had several hits on the Billboard Hot 100 throughout the 1970s and 1980s, including two chart-toppers written by Cronin: "Keep on Loving You" (1980) and "Can't Fight This Feeling" (1984).

Early life 

Cronin is from the suburbs of Chicago, Illinois, area. He was born in north suburban Evanston, Illinois and grew up (and learned guitar) in southwest suburban Oak Lawn. He attended St. Linus Catholic Elementary School. He graduated from Chicago's Brother Rice High School.

Career
Cronin joined REO Speedwagon shortly after the group recorded its debut album in 1971. He recorded one album with the band, 1972's R.E.O./T.W.O., but left the band soon after because of missed rehearsals and creative disagreements. Following a brief solo career, Cronin returned to the fold in 1976.

Cronin's return came after Greg X. Volz turned down the lead vocal position due to his conversion to Christianity. Even though the band's success hit its peak in the late 1970s and early 1980s, they still released records in the 2000s such as Find Your Own Way Home in 2007. Their most famous album, Hi Infidelity, sold over 10 million copies. Cronin has stated in various interviews that they "play for free but get paid for the traveling". He has written or co-written many of the band's hit songs such as "Keep on Loving You", "Can't Fight This Feeling", "Keep the Fire Burnin'", "I Do' Wanna Know", "Keep Pushin'", "Roll with the Changes", "Time for Me to Fly", "Here with Me", "In My Dreams", and "Don't Let Him Go". Cronin possesses the vocal range of a dramatic tenor.

Cronin was a celebrity contestant on Don't Forget the Lyrics! on March 27, 2008. He reached $350,000 before forgetting the lyrics to "Last Dance" by Donna Summer.

He appears on an infomercial advertising TimeLife's Ultimate Rock Ballads, which feature tracks by REO Speedwagon, mostly from the 1980s, when the band enjoyed their greatest success.

Cronin appeared on the Netflix original series Ozark along with bandmates from REO Speedwagon in S03E03.  The episode was titled "Kevin Cronin Was Here", and they performed "Time for Me to Fly".  The popularity of the show led to a resurgence on the Billboard charts for the band in April 2020, as well as a placement onto the digital charts not in existence at the time of the initial hit songs.

Gear

Guitars
 1952 Fender Telecaster
 1958 Fender Broadcaster
 Gibson Les Paul
 Ovation Viper Series 6 & 12 String

Amps 
 Vox AC-30 Combos

Accessories 
 Ernie Ball Acoustic & Electric Guitar Strings

References

External links

1951 births
American rock guitarists
American male guitarists
American male singers
American rock singers
Living people
People from Oak Lawn, Illinois
REO Speedwagon members
20th-century American guitarists
20th-century American male musicians
American tenors
Rhythm guitarists
Songwriters from Illinois
American rock pianists
American male songwriters
American soft rock musicians